Austria competed at the 2014 Summer Youth Olympics, in Nanjing, China from 16 August to 28 August 2014.

Medalists
Medals awarded to participants of mixed-NOC (Combined) teams are represented in italics. These medals are not counted towards the individual NOC medal tally.

Athletics

Austria qualified three athletes.

Qualification Legend: Q=Final A (medal); qB=Final B (non-medal); qC=Final C (non-medal); qD=Final D (non-medal); qE=Final E (non-medal)

Boys
Track & road events

Field Events

Girls
Track & road events

Badminton

Austria qualified two athletes based on the 2 May 2014 BWF Junior World Rankings.

Singles

Doubles

Beach volleyball

Austria qualified two teams by being the highest ranked nation not yet qualified.

Canoeing

Austria qualified one athlete based on its performance at the 2013 World Junior Canoe Sprint and Slalom Championships.

Girls

Cycling

Austria qualified a boys' and girls' team based on its ranking issued by the UCI.

Team

Mixed Relay

Golf

Austria qualified one team of two athletes based on the 8 June 2014 IGF Combined World Amateur Golf Rankings.

Individual

Team

Gymnastics

Artistic Gymnastics

Austria qualified one athlete based on its performance at the 2014 European MAG Championships and another athlete based on its performance at the 2014 European WAG Championships.

Boys

Girls

Judo

Austria qualified two athletes based on its performance at the 2013 Cadet World Judo Championships.

Individual

Team

Modern Pentathlon

Austria qualified one athlete based on its performance at the 2014 Youth A World Championships.

Rowing

Austria qualified one boat based on its performance at the 2013 World Rowing Junior Championships.

Qualification Legend: FA=Final A (medal); FB=Final B (non-medal); FC=Final C (non-medal); FD=Final D (non-medal); SA/B=Semifinals A/B; SC/D=Semifinals C/D; R=Repechage

Shooting

Austria qualified one shooter base on its performance at the 2014 European Shooting Championships.

Individual

Team

Swimming

Austria qualified four swimmers.

Boys

Girls

Table Tennis

Austria qualified two athlete based on its performance at the Road to Nanjing series.

Singles

Team

Qualification Legend: Q=Main Bracket (medal); qB=Consolation Bracket (non-medal)

Taekwondo

Austria qualified one athlete based on its performance at the Taekwondo Qualification Tournament.

Boys

Triathlon

Austria qualified two athletes based on its performance at the 2014 European Youth Olympic Games Qualifier.

Individual

Relay

References

2014 in Austrian sport
Nations at the 2014 Summer Youth Olympics
Austria at the Youth Olympics